Calum McNeil (born 30 April 1966) is a British wrestler. He competed in the men's freestyle 68 kg at the 1992 Summer Olympics.

References

1966 births
Living people
British male sport wrestlers
Olympic wrestlers of Great Britain
Wrestlers at the 1992 Summer Olympics
Sportspeople from Glasgow
Commonwealth Games bronze medallists for Scotland
Commonwealth Games medallists in wrestling
Wrestlers at the 1994 Commonwealth Games
Medallists at the 1994 Commonwealth Games